The Paramus Public Schools are a comprehensive community public school district that serves students in kindergarten through twelfth grade from Paramus, in Bergen County, New Jersey, United States.

As of the 2019–20 school year, the district, comprising eight schools, had an enrollment of 3,760 students and 332.7 classroom teachers (on an FTE basis), for a student–teacher ratio of 11.3:1.

The district is classified by the New Jersey Department of Education as being in District Factor Group "GH", the third-highest of eight groupings. District Factor Groups organize districts statewide to allow comparison by common socioeconomic characteristics of the local districts. From lowest socioeconomic status to highest, the categories are A, B, CD, DE, FG, GH, I and J.

Awards and recognition
Three of the district's schools have been formally designated as National Blue Ribbon Schools, the highest honor that an American school can achieve: Paramus High School in 1988-89, Parkway Elementary School in 1987-88 and Ridge Ranch Elementary School in 1998-99.

For the 1995-96 school year, Ridge Ranch Elementary School was named as a "Star School" by the New Jersey Department of Education, the highest honor that a New Jersey school can achieve.

The district was selected as one of the top "100 Best Communities for Music Education in America 2005" by the American Music Conference, and was selected again for this honor in 2006.

NAMM named the district in its 2008 survey of the "Best Communities for Music Education", which included 110 school districts nationwide. The district was also named in NAMM's 2009 survey of the "Best Communities for Music Education", which included 124 school districts nationwide.

Schools
Schools in the district, with 2019–20 enrollment data from the National Center for Education Statistics, are:
Elementary schools
Memorial Elementary School (302 students in grades K–4)
Laverne O'Boyle, Principal
Midland Elementary School (177 students in grades K–4)
Cynthia Hulse, Principal
Parkway Elementary School (314 students in grades PreK–4)
Suzanne Barbi, Principal
Ridge Ranch Elementary School (337 students in grades K–4)
Jeanine Nostrame, Principal
Stony Lane Elementary School (186 students in grades K–4)
Thomas Marshall, Principal
Middle schools
East Brook Middle School (575 students in grades 5–8)
Ryan Aupperlee, Principal
West Brook Middle School (577 students in grades 5–8)
Deirdre Spollen-LaRaia, Principal
High school
Paramus High School (1,253 students in grades 9–12)
Raymond J. Kiem, Principal

Controversies and incidents
In late May 2007, The Record reported that Paramus Public School officials had knowingly failed to report the presence of the banned pesticides aldrin, dieldrin and chlordane on the campus of West Brook, a middle school in the system.  Responding to local outrage, the superintendent, Janice Dime, assured in a letter addressed to the public that the chemicals were not hazardous, however, borough mayor, Jim Tedesco, described Dime's statement as being either misinformed or deliberately misleading.  Because of public pressure, on June 6, 2007, the district's board of education placed Janice Dime on an extended leave and shut down West Brook Middle School for decontamination and testing.  On June 13, test results done by a borough-contracted firm revealed that two of the 30 tested areas on campus had levels of chlordane that exceeded state safety standards. Since the incident more soil tests have been conducted around the area and in other parts of Paramus, with some yielding positive for excessive presence of pesticide. West Brook was decontaminated and reopened to students, while Janice Dime resigned from her position as superintendent.

In May 2018, a 51-year-old teacher, Jennifer Williamson, and a ten-year-old student at East Brook Middle School, Miranda Faith Vargas, were killed and dozens of students were injured when a dump truck slammed into their school bus on Interstate 80 while travelling on a field trip to Waterloo Village. The 77-year-old driver, who had had his driver's license suspended 14 times before the accident, was charged with vehicular homicide, which could lead to a sentence of ten years in jail upon conviction. Days after the crash, Cong. Josh Gottheimer pushed for a federal law requiring school buses to have seat belts to prevent deaths in similar types of crashes.

Administration 
Core members of the district's administration are:
Sean Adams, Superintendent
Brooke Bartley Business Administrator / Board Secretary

Board of education
The district's board of education, comprised of nine members, sets policy and oversees the fiscal and educational operation of the district through its administration. As a Type II school district, the board's trustees are elected directly by voters to serve three-year terms of office on a staggered basis, with three seats up for election each year held (since 2012) as part of the November general election. The board appoints a superintendent to oversee the day-to-day operation of the district.

References

Further reading
 Wassel, Brian. "Grants to provide Paramus teachers with enhanced training". The Record, June 27, 2013.

External links
Paramus Public Schools

Paramus Public Schools, National Center for Education Statistics

Paramus, New Jersey
New Jersey District Factor Group GH
School districts in Bergen County, New Jersey